Rotaliotina springsteeni is a species of small sea snail, a marine gastropod mollusk, in the family Liotiidae.

Description
The diameter of the nearly planispiral shell varies between 8 mm and 10 mm. The shell contains 3½ whorls with blunt double spines.

Distribution
This marine species occurs off the Philippines and Thailand.

References

 Huang, Shih-I. (2023). Nomenclatural notes on fossil liotiid taxa and description of Cyclostrema filipino n. sp. from the Philippines (Mollusca: Gastropoda, Liotiidae). Bulletin of Malacology, Taiwan. 46: 24-46.

External links
 McLean, J. H. (1988). Two new species of Liotiinae (Gastropoda: Turbinidae) from the Philippine Islands. Veliger. 30(4): 408-411
 To World Register of Marine Species
 

springsteeni
Gastropods described in 1988